The Sacred Heart Cathedral is a religious building that is affiliated with the Catholic Church and is located at 1 Green in the city of Bloemfontein in the Free State province, South Africa.

It serves as the main church and seat of the Catholic Archdiocese of Bloemfontein (Archidioecesis Bloemfonteinensis) which was created in 1951 with the bull Suprema Nobis of Pope Pius XII and depends on the ecclesiastical province of the same name. Its metropolitan archbishop since 2020 is Zolile Peter Mpambani.

See also
Roman Catholicism in South Africa
Sacred Heart Cathedral (disambiguation)

References

Roman Catholic cathedrals in South Africa
Buildings and structures in Bloemfontein
Churches in the Free State (province)